Hasan ibn Ali ibn Muhammad, better known as Hasan al-Askari, was a descendant of the Islamic prophet Muhammad. He is regarded as the eleventh of the Twelve Imams, succeeding his father, Ali al-Hadi. Hasan Al-Askari was born in Medina in 844 and brought with his father to the garrison town of Samarra in 848, where the Abbasid caliphs held them under close surveillance until their deaths, even though neither were politically active. After the death of al-Hadi in 868, the majority of his following acknowledged his son, al-Askari, as their next Imam. Al-Askari's contact with the Shia population was restricted by the caliphs and instead he communicated with his followers through a network of representatives. He died in Samarra in 873-874 at the age of about twenty-eight and was buried in the family home next to his father, which later developed into al-Askari shrine, a major center for Shia pilgrimage. Shia sources commonly hold the Abbasids responsible for the death of al-Askari and his father. A well-known early Shia commentary of the Quran is attributed to al-Askari.

Al-Askari died without leaving an obvious heir, which created widespread confusion and fragmented the Shia community into several sects, all of which disappeared within a few decades except the Twelver Shia. The Twelvers hold that al-Askari had a son, commonly known as Muhammad al-Mahdi, who was kept hidden from the public out of the fear of Abbasid persecution. Al-Mahdi succeeded to the imamate after the death of his father and entered a state of occultation. His life is said to be miraculously prolonged until the day he manifests himself again by God's permission to fill the earth with justice. Though in occultation, the Imam still remains responsible in Twelver belief for the spiritual guidance of humankind and the Shia accounts of his occasional encounters with the pious are numerous and popular.

Titles 
Hasan ibn Ali is known by the titles al-Samet, al-Hadi, and al-Zaki, though his most common title is al-Askari، on the account of his almost life-long detention in Samarra, a garrison town not far from Baghdad which was the capital of the Abbasids at the time. As a great-grandson of Ali al-Rida, the eighth of the Twelve Imams, Hasan was also known by his contemporaries as Ibn al-Rida (lit. 'son of al-Rida').

Birth and early life
Most Shia sources state that Hasan ibn Ali was born in Rabi' al-Awwal 230 AH (November 844), though other given dates range from 845 to 847. The Shia currently celebrate 8 Rabi' al-Thani as his birthday. Hasan was born in Medina, though Donaldson has cast doubt on this, as he is uncertain between Medina and Samarra. His father was the tenth Shia Imam, Ali al-Hadi, and his mother was a freed slave (umm walad), whose name is variously given as Hudayth, Susan, or Salil in different sources. At the age of about two, Hasan was brought to Samarra with his father in 233 or 234 AH (847-849), where the latter was held under close surveillance by the Abbasid caliphs until his death in 254 (868), some twenty years later.

When Hasan was about twenty-two, an agent of his father is said to have providentially bought a Byzantine concubine, named Narjis (Narcissus), who was given to Hasan in marriage, and later bore him his only son. Other sources give her name variously as Saqil, Sawsan, and Rayhana. The detailed accounts of Majlesi and Tusi describe Narjis as a captured granddaughter of the Byzantine emperor and a pious woman who was told in a dream about her future union with Hasan, though these accounts have been described as hagiographic. Some other accounts describe Narjis as Nubian.

Designation as the Imam 
After the death of al-Hadi in 868, the majority of his followers acknowledged his son, Hasan al-Askari, as their next Imam. Shia sources report that al-Hadi designated Hasan as the next Imam a few months before his death. After al-Hadi, his another son, Ja'far, unsuccessfully claimed the imamate for himself. Madelung adds that some had expected another son of al-Hadi, Abu Ja'far Moḥammad, to be the next Imam but he predeceased his father in Samarra.

Imamate

The imamate of al-Askari began in 868 and lasted only about six years, overlapping with the caliphates of the Abbasid al-Mu'tazz, al-Muhtadi, and al-Mu'tamid. During these years, though not politically active, al-Askari mostly lived under house arrest in Samarra, subject to constant surveillance. He therefore communicated with his followers mostly through a network of representatives, notably Uthman ibn Sa'id. Tabatabai and Sachedina write that al-Askari was not allowed any social contact with the general Shia population. Tabatabai also suggests that these restrictions were placed on al-Askari because the caliphate had come to know about the traditions, circulating among the Shia elite, which predicted that the eleventh Imam would father the eschatological Mahdi. They often conferred divinity on the Shia Imams and included the Namiriya, who followed Mohammad ibn Nosayr Namiri in Kufa, and the Eshaqiya, the adherents of Eshaq ibn Moḥammad Nakha'i Basri in Basra, Baghdad, and Mada'in.

Reigns of al-Mu'tazz and al-Muhtadi 
After the death of his father in 868, al-Askari was imprisoned by al-Mu'tazz in Baghdad, and he was kept in prison through the short reign of al-Muhtadi, the next caliph.

Reign of al-Mu'tamid 
The persecution of the Shia continued under al-Mu'tamid, a son of al-Mutawakkil. It is believed that most of al-Askari's prison experiences happened during the caliphate of al-Mu'tamid, who is represented in Shia sources as his main oppressor. Al-Askari is said to have criticized the caliph for restricting the administration of Khums, the Islamic alms distributed among the descendants of the prophet, who were forbidden from receiving general alms in the prophet's lifetime. In his lifetime, a main source of assistance for the poor in his clan, the Banu Hashim, was the income of agricultural lands in Fadak. Historically, Abu Bakr, the first Rashidun caliph, discontinued the prophet's policies and, in particular, reappropriated Fadak as public property, forcing Banu Hashim to rely on general alms, possibly to undermine their claims to the caliphate and cut their privileges as the prophet's kins. This policy was partially reversed by his successor, Umar, and then by the Umayyad Umar II, though later caliphs again appended Fadak to the state treasury.

Death

At the age of about twenty-eight, al-Askari died on 1 or 8 Rabi' al-Awwal 260 AH (25 December 873 or 1 January 874) after a week-long illness. The Shia currently commemorate 8 Rabi' al-Awwal for this occasion. Shia sources commonly attribute his death to poisoning at the instigation of al-Mu'tamid. During the week of his illness, many notable Alid and Abbasid figures visited him on his deathbed and the caliph also sent his doctors and servants to attend the Imam. However, considering that al-Askari did not have an obvious heir, Tabatabai maintains that the caliph intended to closely monitor the Imam and later continued to search for his offspring after his death. Hussain, Amir-Moezzi, and Sachedina present similar accounts.

Al-Askari was buried in the family home, next to his father, Ali al-Hadi. The house was later expanded to a major shrine by various Shia and Sunni patrons. More recently, Naser al-Din Shah Qajar ordered to rebuild the complex in 1868-9 and the golden dome was added in 1905. The shrine also houses the tomb of his aunt, Hakima Khatun. As an important destination for Shia pilgrimage, the shrine was bombed in February 2006 and badly damaged. Another attack was executed on 13 June 2007, which led to the destruction of the two minarets of the shrine. Authorities in Iraq hold al-Qaeda responsible for this attack.

Succession

As the eleventh Shia Imam, al-Askari died in 873-874 without leaving an obvious heir, which created widespread confusion and fragmented the Shia community into up to twenty sects. All these sects, however, disappeared within a hundred years except the Twelver Shia. Some of them held that the imamate ceased with al-Askari and the Waqifiyya maintained that he would later emerge as the eschatological Mahdi. Others concluded that Muhammad ibn al-Hadi, a deceased brother of al-Askari, must have been the true Imam. Yet others accepted the imamate of Ja'far ibn al-Hadi, another brother of al-Askari, who had earlier unsuccessfully claimed the imamate for himself after the death of their father, al-Hadi. Some believed that the twelfth Imam would be born in the end of times to a descendant of al-Askari.

Occultation 
The group that went on to become the Twelvers largely held that al-Askari had a son, named Abu al-Qasim Muhammad, same name as the prophet. Born around 255 (868),  he is also known as Muhammad al-Mahdi. Out of the fear of Abbasid persecution, Muhammad was kept hidden from the public and his existence was only known to a few trusted associates of the eleventh Imam. After the death of his father, Muhammad is said to have made his only public appearance to lead the funeral prayers for his father instead of his uncle, Ja'far. He was not seen publicly afterwards and entered a state of occultation for the fear of persecution. This is said to have happened in the family home in Samarra, where currently a mosque stands, under which there is a cellar that hides a well (Bi'r al-Ghayba), into which al-Mahdi is said to have disappeared. 

Immediately after the death of al-Askari, his main representative, Uthman al-Amri, claimed to be the Bab to the hidden al-Mahdi. This was likely not a radical change for the Shia. Indeed, the tenth and eleventh Imams were also effectively in occultation for the majority of the Shia, as both Imams were held nearly isolated and under close surveillance by the Abbasid caliphs in Samarra. Uthman received petitions and made available their responses, sometimes in writing. According to Daftary, these responses were in Uthman's handwriting, whereas Hussain holds that the handwriting and style did not change even after Uthman's death, suggesting that the responses were written by al-Mahdi. This consistency, according to Hussain, partially explains the consensus of his followers on when the Major Occultation began.

Uthman later introduced his son, Abu Ja'far Muhammad ibn Uthman, as the next representative of al-Mahdi. In turn, he nominated Abu al-Qasim al-Husayn ibn Ruh al-Nawbakhti as the next representative. After about seventy years, this period of Minor Occultation ended with the death of the fourth representative, Abu al-Hasan Ali ibn Muhammad al-Samarri, who is said to have received a letter from al-Mahdi in 329 (941). The letter predicted the death of Abu al-Hasan in six days and announced the beginning of the Major Occultation which, the letter stated, would continue until God grants permission to al-Mahdi to manifest himself again in a time when the earth would be filled with tyranny. It has been noted that the number of these agents was not limited to four in early Shia sources, and Momen suggests that the former network of the representatives likely continued to operate during the Lesser Occultation.

Twelver doctrine of occultation 
The Twelver doctrine of occultation crystallized in the first half of the fourth (tenth) century. In its simplest form, this doctrine states that Muhammad al-Mahdi, the twelfth Imam, did not die but has been concealed by God from the mankind and his life has been miraculously prolonged until the day he manifests himself again by God's permission to fill the earth with justice. This occultation continues until the life of Imam is not threatened by enemies, and until the humankind is ready to receive his guidance. During the Minor Occultation, he remained in contact with his followers through the four Babs (gates). During the Major Occultation, which started in 329 (941) and continues to this day, there is no direct communication, though the Imam still remains responsible in Shia belief for the spiritual guidance of humankind, as the sun behind a cloud still gives light and warmth. It also is believed that al-Mahdi occasionally appears to the pious in person or more commonly in dreams and visions. The accounts of these encounters are popular among the Shia. The Shia literature about the doctrine of occultation is extensive, based both on rational and textual arguments. One such instance is a famous hadith attributed to the prophet by both Shia and Sunni authorities. This hadith states that, "If the earth had only one day of existence left to it, God would prolong that day until a man of my posterity, whose name will be my name, and his surname my surname, manifests himself; he will fill the earth, filled till then with violence and oppression, with harmony and justice."

Works 
A well-known early Shia commentary of the Quran is attributed to al-Askari, which is believed to be authentic by some Shia authorities, notably, al-Mufid. In the context of Shia responsibilities in the absence of Imams, a hadith ascribed to al-Askari is given by Mavani. The hadith states that, "It is obligatory for the populace to follow the jurist who refrains from committing wrong, mentions his faith, opposes carnal desire, and obeys Allah’s command." Haider quotes a hadith, attributed to al-Askari, about the specific characteristics that distinguish a Shia from the wider mass of Muslims: "There are five signs of a believer: fifty-one cycles of prayer [every day], the pilgrimage to Husayn's tomb forty days after the anniversary of his death, the wearing of a ring on the right hand, the placing of the forehead on the earth in prostration, and the audible recitation of the  [during daily prayers]." In the context of intercession, al-Askari is reported to have said that only a small fraction of God’s mercy has been dispersed among His creation in this world. All of God's mercy will be diffused on the Day of Judgement by means of which true Muslims will successfully intercede on behalf of their communities.

See also

 List of extinct Shia sects
 Muhammadite Shia

Footnotes

References

External links

 The Eleventh Imam Hasan ibn Ali (al-Askari)

840s births
874 deaths
9th-century Arabs
9th-century imams
9th-century people from the Abbasid Caliphate
People from Medina
Twelve Imams
Deaths by poisoning
Husaynids